HMS Orby was a  sloop of the British Royal Navy.

References
 
 

 

1918 ships
24-class sloops
Ships built by Swan Hunter